Scott Hugh Rash (born 1963) is a United States district judge of the United States District Court for the District of Arizona and former state court judge.

Education 

Rash earned his Bachelor of Science in Business Administration, with highest honors, from the University of Arizona in 1985 and his Juris Doctor, cum laude, from the University of Arizona College of Law in 1991.

Career 

Early in his career, Rash served as an assistant attorney general of criminal prosecution in the Office of the Arizona Attorney General. He was a shareholder at Gabroy, Rollman, & Bossé in Tucson, Arizona, where his practice focused on civil litigation matters. From 2010 to 2020, Rash was a judge on the Arizona Superior Court in Pima County, where he was the presiding family law judge.

Federal judicial service 

On September 12, 2019, President Donald Trump announced his intent to nominate Rash to serve as a United States district judge for the United States District Court for the District of Arizona. On October 15, 2019, his nomination was sent to the Senate. President Trump nominated Rash to the seat vacated by Judge Cindy K. Jorgenson, who assumed senior status on April 6, 2018. A hearing on his nomination before the Senate Judiciary Committee was held on December 4, 2019. On January 16, 2020, his nomination was reported out of committee by a 16–6 vote. On May 18, 2020, the United States Senate voted 67–21 to invoke cloture on his nomination. On May 19, 2020, his nomination was confirmed by a 74–20 vote. He received his judicial commission on May 27, 2020.

Memberships 

He has been a member of the Federalist Society since 2018.

References

External links 
 
 

1963 births
Living people
20th-century American lawyers
21st-century American lawyers
21st-century American judges
Arizona lawyers
Arizona state court judges
Federalist Society members
James E. Rogers College of Law alumni
Judges of the United States District Court for the District of Arizona
People from Minneapolis
Superior court judges in the United States
United States district court judges appointed by Donald Trump
University of Arizona alumni